La Plata County is a county located in the U.S. state of Colorado. As of the 2020 census, the population was 55,638. The county seat is Durango. The county was named for the La Plata River and the La Plata Mountains.  "La plata" means "the silver" in Spanish.

La Plata County comprises the Durango, CO Micropolitan Statistical Area.

The county is home to Durango Rock Shelters Archeology Site, the type site for the Basketmaker II period of Anasazi culture.

Geography

Adjacent counties
San Juan County - north
Hinsdale County - northeast
Archuleta County - east
San Juan County, New Mexico - south
Montezuma County - west
Dolores County - northwest

Major Highways
  U.S. Highway 160
  U.S. Highway 550
  State Highway 140
  State Highway 151
  State Highway 172

Demographics

As of the census of 2000, there were 43,941 people in the county, organized into 17,342 households and 10,890 families.  The population density was 26 people per square mile (10/km2).  There were 20,765 housing units at an average density of 12 per square mile (5/km2).  The racial makeup of the county was 87.31% White, 5.78% Native American, 0.40% Asian, 0.31% Black or African American, 0.05% Pacific Islander, 3.90% from other races, and 2.25% from two or more races.  10.40% of the population were Hispanic or Latino of any race.

There were 17,342 households, out of which 29.60% had children under the age of 18 living with them, 49.90% were married couples living together, 8.70% had a female householder with no husband present, and 37.20% were non-families. 24.80% of all households were made up of individuals, and 6.10% had someone living alone who was 65 years of age or older.  The average household size was 2.43 and the average family size was 2.92.

In the county, the population was spread out, with 22.70% under the age of 18, 13.90% from 18 to 24, 29.00% from 25 to 44, 25.10% from 45 to 64, and 9.40% who were 65 years of age or older.  The median age was 36 years.  For every 100 females there were 103.60 males.  For every 100 females age 18 and over, there were 103.10 males.

The median income for a household in the county was $40,159, and the median income for a family was $50,446. Males had a median income of $32,486 versus $24,666 for females. The per capita income for the county was $21,534.  11.70% of the population and 6.70% of families were below the poverty line.  Out of the total population, 9.30% of those under the age of 18 and 7.70% of those 65 and older were living below the poverty line.

Communities

City
Durango

Towns
Bayfield
Ignacio

Census-designated place
Southern Ute

 Marvel

Other unincorporated communities

Allison
Bondad
Breen
Falfa
Gem Village
Hermosa
Hesperus
Kline
Mayday
Oxford
Redmesa
Tiffany

Ghost towns
Greysill Mines
La Plata
Parrott City

Politics
In its early years La Plata County generally leaned towards the Democratic Party. Only Benjamin Harrison in 1888, and the three landslide victories of Theodore Roosevelt, Warren G. Harding and Herbert Hoover saw the county vote Republican before World War II. In the period between 1940 and 1988, however, the county – like Colorado generally – took a turn towards supporting the Republican Party, with the result that between 1940 and 2000 the only Democrat to obtain a majority in the county was Lyndon Johnson in 1964. Since John Kerry became the first candidate in sixteen years from either party to gain a majority in La Plata County in the 2004 election, the county has tended towards the Democratic Party: Barack Obama’s 2008 share of the vote was the highest for a Democrat since Woodrow Wilson's 92 years prior. In the 2020 election, Joe Biden handily won majority of the vote in the county, with a higher share of the vote than the previous presidential elections.

Recreation

National forest and wilderness
San Juan National Forest
Weminuche Wilderness

National historic district
Durango-Silverton Narrow-Gauge Railroad National Historic District

Trails
Colorado Trail
Old Spanish National Historic Trail

Bicycle route
Great Parks Bicycle Route

Scenic byway
San Juan Skyway National Scenic Byway

See also

East Canyon Fire
Outline of Colorado
Index of Colorado-related articles
Colorado census statistical areas
Durango Micropolitan Statistical Area
National Register of Historic Places listings in La Plata County, Colorado

References

External links
La Plata County Government website
La Plata County State Register properties
Colorado County Evolution by Don Stanwyck
Colorado Historical Society
La Plata County Central Reservations
Access Durango, Colorado Community Portal

 

 
Colorado counties
1874 establishments in Colorado Territory
Populated places established in 1874